William Homer Thornberry (January 9, 1909 – December 12, 1995) was an American politician and judge.  He served as the United States representative from the 10th congressional district of Texas from 1949 to 1963.  From 1963 to 1965 he was a judge for the United States District Court for the Western District of Texas, and he was a judge for the United States Court of Appeals for the Fifth Circuit from 1965 to 1978.

Early life
Thornberry was born in Austin, Texas. His parents were teachers in the State School for the Deaf and were themselves deaf. He attended public schools in Austin and graduated from Austin High School in 1927. He received a Bachelor of Business Administration in 1932 from the University of Texas at Austin and his Bachelor of Laws in 1936, from the University of Texas School of Law, where he was a member of the Acacia fraternity. He was in private practice of law in Austin from 1936 to 1941. He was a Member of the Texas House of Representatives from 1937 to 1941. He was district attorney of Travis County, Texas from 1941 to 1942. He was a United States Navy Lieutenant Commander from 1942 to 1946. He was in private practice of law in Austin from 1946 to 1948. He was a Member of the Austin City Council from 1946 to 1948.

United States representative 
Thornberry was elected in 1948 to the 81st United States Congress as a United States representative of the 10th congressional district of Texas. In winning the seat, he replaced its former occupant, Lyndon B. Johnson, who had been elected that year for the first time to the United States Senate. Thornberry was a member of the Rules Committee of the United States House of Representatives from January 1955 to his 1963 resignation, when he was appointed by Johnson, now President, to the federal bench.

He was one of the majority of the Texan delegation to decline to sign the 1956 Southern Manifesto opposing the desegregation of public schools ordered by the Supreme Court in Brown v. Board of Education. Thornberry voted against the Civil Rights Act of 1957 but in favor of the Civil Rights Act of 1960 and the 24th Amendment to the U.S. Constitution.

Thornberry was present on Air Force One and witnessed Lyndon Johnson taking the oath of office following the assassination of President Kennedy.

Federal judicial service
Thornberry was nominated by President John F. Kennedy on July 9, 1963, to a seat on the United States District Court for the Western District of Texas vacated by Judge R. Ewing Thomason. He was confirmed by the United States Senate on July 15, 1963, and received his commission from President Lyndon B. Johnson on December 17, 1963. His service was terminated on July 2, 1965, due to elevation to the Fifth Circuit.

Thornberry was nominated by President Johnson on June 22, 1965, to a seat on the United States Court of Appeals for the Fifth Circuit vacated by Judge Joseph Chappell Hutcheson Jr. He was confirmed by the Senate on July 1, 1965, and received his commission the same day. He assumed senior status on December 21, 1978. His service was terminated on December 12, 1995, due to his death.

Supreme Court nomination
On June 26, 1968, Johnson nominated Thornberry as an associate justice of the United States Supreme Court, to fill the anticipated vacancy to be created by the nomination of associate justice Abe Fortas to become the next chief justice, upon the retirement of Earl Warren. The Senate Judiciary Committee held hearings on the nomination simultaneously with those on the Fortas nomination. On October 4, 1968, after several days of contentious debate on the floor of the Senate, and with prospects for confirmation fading, Johnson withdrew the Fortas nomination. As Fortas remained an associate justice, Thornberry's nomination became moot; no further action was taken and the nomination was withdrawn by the president.

Death

Thornberry died on December 12, 1995, at his home in Austin and was interred at the Texas State Cemetery in Austin.

He was first married to the former Eloise Engle (1919–1989).  After her death he wed Marian Davis.  With his first wife, Thornberry was the father of three children, Molly, David, and Kate. He received an honorary doctorate degree from Gallaudet University in 1954.

References

Sources
 
 
 "William Thornberry". Texas State Cemetery. Retrieved 20 June 2005.

 The University of Texas Alumni Magazine

|-

|-

1909 births
1995 deaths
20th-century American judges
20th-century American lawyers
20th-century American politicians
United States Navy personnel of World War II
American prosecutors
Austin City Council members
Austin High School (Austin, Texas) alumni
Burials at Texas State Cemetery
Democratic Party members of the United States House of Representatives from Texas
Gallaudet University people
Judges of the United States Court of Appeals for the Fifth Circuit
Judges of the United States District Court for the Western District of Texas
Democratic Party members of the Texas House of Representatives
People from Austin, Texas
United States court of appeals judges appointed by Lyndon B. Johnson
United States district court judges appointed by John F. Kennedy
United States Navy officers
University of Texas School of Law alumni
Unsuccessful nominees to the United States Supreme Court